Pencak Silat at the 2007 Southeast Asian Games was held in the Sung Noen Municipality Hall, Sung Noen, Nakhon Ratchasima, Thailand.

Medal tally

Medalists

Art

Combat

Men

Women

External links
Southeast Asian Games Official Results

2007 Southeast Asian Games events
2007